Kizhakadaiyam railway station (station code: KKY) belongs to the Madurai railway division. It has automated ticket vending.

Timetable

References

Railway stations in Tamil Nadu